Barricade Mountain is a summit in Alberta, Canada.

Barricade Mountain was named for a rock outcropping in the form of a natural barricade.

References

Three-thousanders of Alberta
Alberta's Rockies